Alexander Sdvizhkov is a Belarusian journalist. He is the deputy chief editor for Zgoda, a weekly periodical.

Sdvizhkov was jailed for 3 years for printing cartoons of the Muslim prophet Muhammad. "We did the right thing by speaking out against Islamic hysteria," Sdvizhkov said. He is currently being held at the Belarusian Interior Ministry's transfer prison in Minsk, with no means of communication and no date set to hear his appeal. The arrest is the first arrest in Europe since the Danish cartoons issue came up.

References 

Freedom of expression
Living people
Belarusian journalists
Year of birth missing (living people)
Imprisoned journalists